Burst of Joy is a Pulitzer Prize-winning photograph by Associated Press photographer Slava "Sal" Veder, taken on March 17, 1973, at Travis Air Force Base in Solano County, California, United States.

The event at Travis Air Force Base
The first group of American POWs leaving North Vietnamese prison camps left Hanoi on a United States Air Force (USAF) Lockheed C-141 Starlifter nicknamed the Hanoi Taxi, which flew them to Clark Air Base in the Philippines for medical examinations. On March 17, the plane landed at Travis Air Force Base in Solano County, California. Even though there were only twenty POWs of that first increment released aboard the plane, almost 400 family members turned up for the homecoming.

USAF Lieutenant Colonel Robert L. Stirm made a speech "on behalf of himself and other POWs who had arrived from Vietnam as part of Operation Homecoming."

Smithsonian Magazine says that "Veder, who'd been standing in a crowded bullpen with dozens of other journalists, noticed the sprinting family and started taking pictures. 'You could feel the energy and the raw emotion in the air'."

Developing the latent images
Veder then rushed to the makeshift photo developing station (for 35 mm film) in the ladies' room of the air base's flightline washrooms, while the photographers from United Press International were in the men's. Smithsonian Magazine says that "In less than half an hour, Veder and his AP colleague Walt Zeboski had developed six remarkable images of that singular moment. Veder's pick, which he instantly titled Burst of Joy, was sent out over the news-service wires".

The depicted persons
The photograph depicts United States Air Force Lieutenant Colonel Robert L. Stirm being reunited with his family, after spending more than five years in captivity as a prisoner of war in North Vietnam. On October 27, 1967, Stirm was shot down over Hanoi while leading a flight of F-105s on a bombing mission, and was not released until March 14, 1973. The centerpiece of the photograph is Stirm's 15-year-old daughter Lorrie, who is excitedly greeting her father with outstretched arms, as the rest of the family approaches directly behind her. Lorrie later recounted in 2003: "We were in a car behind the aircraft on the tarmac, and then they said, "You can get out now." So we just burst out of the car and started running to my dad. . . We were very excited." Lorrie's exuberant reaction earned her moniker "The Jumper" or "The Leaper."

Despite outward appearances, the reunion was an unhappy one for Stirm. Three days before he arrived in the United States, the same day he was released from captivity, Stirm received a Dear John letter from his wife Loretta informing him that their marriage was over.  Stirm later learned that Loretta had been with other men throughout his captivity and had received marriage proposals from three of them.  In 1974, the Stirms divorced and Loretta remarried, but Lieutenant Colonel Stirm was still ordered by the courts to provide her with 43% of his military retirement pay once he retired from the Air Force. Stirm was later promoted to full Colonel and retired from the Air Force in 1977. Loretta died on August 13, 2010 from cancer.

After Burst of Joy was announced as the winner of the Pulitzer Prize, all of the family members depicted in the picture received copies. The depicted children display it prominently in their homes, but not Colonel Stirm, who in 2005 said he cannot bring himself to display the picture.

Lorrie Stirm appeared on Antiques Roadshow Season 27 Episode 1 on January 2, 2023 seeking an appraisal for an archive of items relating to the event: Lorrie's personal print of the famous photograph (signed by the photographer in 1990), Lt. Col. Stirm's prison uniform, Red Cross luggage with North Vietnamese tag, a spoon engraved Lt. Col. Stirm with a thunderbolt during his imprisonment and a pair of sandals the North Vietnamese claimed were made from the wheels of Stirm's crashed plane. Auctioneer Joel Bohy valued the items as worth $2500-$3000 at auction, but said the "historical value on this is absolutely priceless."

Reactions
About the picture and its legacy, Lorrie Stirm Kitching once noted, "We have this very nice picture of a very happy moment, but every time I look at it, I remember the families that weren't reunited, and the ones that aren't being reunited today—many, many families—and I think, I'm one of the lucky ones."

Donald Goldstein, a retired Air Force colonel and a co-author of a prominent Vietnam War photojournalism book, The Vietnam War: The Stories and The Photographs, says of Burst of Joy, "After years of fighting a war we couldn't win, a war that tore us apart, it was finally over, and the country could start healing."

See also
1974 Pulitzer Prize
U.S. prisoners of war during the Vietnam War

Bibliography
Notes

References

 - Total pages: 289 

Boyle, John, director. Filoli, Hour 1. Performance by Coral Peña, PBS: Antique Roadshow, Public Broadcasting Service, 2 Jan. 2023, https://www.pbs.org/wgbh/roadshow/watch/episode/2701K1-filoli-hour-1/. Accessed 18 Jan. 2023.

External links
Pilots from Takhli and Korat Airbases shot down between 1965–1972 
Sad Story Behind 'Burst of Joy' Vietnam POW Photo

1973 in California
Black-and-white photographs
Vietnam War photographs
Pulitzer Prize-winning photographs
Photographs of the United States
Images of the San Francisco Bay Area
Military in the San Francisco Bay Area
Associated Press
United States Air Force
1973 works
1973 in art
1970s photographs